The Men's 4x200 Freestyle Relay event at the 11th FINA World Aquatics Championships was swum on July 29, 2005 in Montreal, Quebec, Canada. 22 teams swam in the event's preliminary heats in the day's morning session; with the top-8 finishers advancing to swim again in the event's final that evening.

At the start of the event, the existing World (WR) and Championships (CR) records were both:
 7:04.66,  Australia, swum July 27, 2001 in Fukuoka, Japan

Results

Final

Preliminaries

References

Swimming at the 2005 World Aquatics Championships